Sports City Stadium may refer to:

 Althawra Sports City Stadium, in San‘a’, Yemen
 Basra Sports City, in Basra, Iraq
 Camille Chamoun Sports City Stadium, in Beirut, Lebanon
 Khalifa Sports City Stadium, in Isa Town, Bahrain
 King Abdullah Sports City, in Jeddah, Saudi Arabia
 Latakia Sports City Stadium, in Latakia, Syria
 Sports City Stadium (Doha), in Doha, Qatar
 Zayed Sports City Stadium, in Abu Dhabi, United Arab Emirates